Mihu Township is an rural township in Sangzhi County, Zhangjiajie, Hunan Province, China.

Administrative division
The township is divided into 13 villages, the following areas: Yaofengjie Village, Jinfengjie Village, Anjiayu Village, Zoujiajie Village, Yejiaqiao Village, Xiaohanyu Village, Xianchiyu Village, Nianzibao Village, Huguo Village, Qiancunping Village, Baishi Village, Sanzijie Village, Guangwentai Village (姚风界村、金丰界村、安家峪村、邹家界村、叶家桥村、小汉峪村、咸池峪村、碾子包村、护国村、前村坪村、白石村、三子界村、广文台村).

References

External links

Former towns and townships of Sangzhi County